Brent Laes (born 18 April 2000) is a Belgian professional footballer who plays for Lierse Kempenzonen in the Belgian First Division B.

Career
Laes made his professional debut for OH Leuven on 23 August 2019 in a Belgian Cup match against Wetteren. Some months later in February 2020, he also played his first league match for the club, 4–1 away loss against Virton.

In January 2021, he was loaned out to Belgian First Division B club Lierse Kempenzonen. At the end of the season, he made a permanent move to the club.

References

External links

2000 births
Living people
Belgian footballers
Association football defenders
Oud-Heverlee Leuven players
Lierse Kempenzonen players
Challenger Pro League players